Hacıömerler can refer to:

 Hacıömerler, Dursunbey
 Hacıömerler, Lapseki